Novica "Nocko" Joković (born 3 July 1973) is a Danish former professional footballer who played as a striker. Born in Denmark, he is of Serbian descent.

Club career
Joković started playing football for hometown club Silkeborg IF, before moving to AGF's youth academy at age 15. He made his professional debut for the club on 12 August 1992, starting in a 1–0 win over Lyngby. He played for the club until 1996, where he returned to Silkeborg. After a successful spell, he returned to AGF again in 2000. He was released from the club in January 2002 after disciplinary issues during practice.

After being a free agent for two months, Joković moved to Scottish club Livingston where he joined compatriot Morten Petersen. He left as his contract expired at the end of the 2001–02 season, which saw Livingston finish third in the Scottish Premier League while Joković made only three appearances in which he did not score. In August 2002, Joković left for Faroese club Havnar Bóltfelag and was part of the team winning the top tier 1. deild before leaving in October 2002 after the season.

Joković returned to Denmark after almost a year as a free agent, signing a two-year contract with Danish 1st Division club Randers FC on 15 August 2003. He retired from football in January 2005 after a spell plagued by knee injuries, and with only two appearances. His stint with Randers had a legal aftermath, and in January 2009 he sued his former club through Spillerforeningen (The Danish Player Association) in a dispute over unpaid insurance money. Randers was sentenced to pay a fee of DKK 150,000 in damages to Joković in March 2010.

International career
Joković made his Denmark under-21 debut against Finland in May 1995. He came on as a substitute for Ulrik Pedersen in the 1–0 loss, after a late Sami Hyypiä goal.

Personal life
Born in Silkeborg, Denmark, to Serbian parents, Vojin and Gordana Joković, Joković has an older brother, Aleksandar.

Joković is divorced from Louise Søndergaard and together they have a daughter and a son.

Legal issues
Joković was convicted in February 2000 of aggravated assault after punching a young man during a night out and was subsequently given a suspended jail term of 30 days. In July 2000 he was involved in another case of assault, but was acquitted in the case in January 2001.

Honours
Havnar Bóltfelag
 1. deild: 2002

Notes

References

External links
 
 

1973 births
Living people
Aarhus Gymnastikforening players
Association football forwards
Danish 1st Division players
Danish Superliga players
Danish expatriate men's footballers
Danish men's footballers
Danish people of Serbian descent
Denmark under-21 international footballers
Expatriate footballers in Scotland
Expatriate footballers in the Faroe Islands
Faroe Islands Premier League players
Havnar Bóltfelag players
Livingston F.C. players
People from Silkeborg
Randers FC players
Scottish Premier League players
Silkeborg IF players
Sportspeople convicted of crimes
Sportspeople from the Central Denmark Region